Lithops helmutii is a species of pebble plant. It is native to Southern Africa.

Description 
The leaves, which grow in pairs of two, are green and marked with grey patterns. The flowers are golden yellow with a white center.

References 

helmutii
Taxa named by Louisa Bolus